Ezra (Ronnie) Labaton (July 21, 1950 – December 4, 2013) was an American Modern Orthodox rabbi and Jewish philosopher. He was a descendant of the Sephardi Jews.

Heritage
Ezra Ronnie Labaton was born on July 21, 1950 in Brooklyn. His ancestry was of Sephardic Jewry, specifically Syrian Jews. He grew up in the Syrian Jewish Community of New York.

Early years and Education
Labaton was educated at Magen David Yeshiva, an elementary yeshiva, and Yeshiva of Flatbush High School.
He attended Yeshiva University and Brandeis University.

During his years in Yeshiva University and throughout the rest of his life, Ezra was a student of Rabbi Joseph Soloveitchik ('the Rav').

Philosophy and Works

Phd Thesis
The Rabbi's PhD Thesis, titled "A Comprehensive Analysis of Rabenu Abraham Maimuni’s Biblical Commentary" was submitted in 2012 to Brandeis University where he was awarded his PhD.

Congregation Magen David of West Deal

Rabbi Labaton served as the Head Rabbi of Congregation Magen David of West Deal from 1982 until his passing in 2013. He was the first full-time Rabbi hired by the synagogue, which was founded by Joseph M. Betesh shortly before. Magen David of West Deal flourished under the Rabbi's leadership.
 
During the 31+ years Rabbi Labaton led the Magen David Synagogue, the Rabbi's philosophy became ingrained in its members. 
The synagogue continues to be dedicated to spread the Rabbi's ideas, ideals, and values;

•To share his unique approach to Torah, which synthesized unwavering commitment and the highest standards of intellectual honesty.
•To celebrate his love for the widest spectrum of books and his reputation as a "fearless reader".
•To teach his passion and deep respect for Torah as a source of ethics.
•To understand the value and beauty in every human being, each created b'Selem Elokim, in the Image of God; and
•To encourage us to continue engaging in acts of tsedaka (charity), mishpat (justice), hesed (loving-kindness), and Tikun Olam  (improving the world)

Other Affiliations

Rabbinical Councils
Sephardic Rabbinical Council
Halachic Organ Donor Society (HODS)
Jersey Shore Orthodox Rabbinate (JSOR)

International
In 1975, while still a graduate student, Rabbi Ezra and his wife Emily Friedman went to South Africa where they conducted seminars for Jewish children. In 1976, Rabbi Ezra and his wife worked to gather critical information on behalf of Soviet Jews in Russia.

Illness
The Rabbi was diagnosed in 1999 with Colon Cancer. He would fight through many cycles of treatment & recurrence as the disease spread, before ultimately passing away in 2013 of advanced lung cancer. In 2004, after recovering from his third recurrence, The Rabbi cited his illness & treatments as having helped him excel in the pastoral aspect of his role as Rabbi. He said it allowed him to empathize and share with other sick people, in a way that he never before was able to. As part of his recovery, the Rabbi became an avid runner, as he ran 5 miles each night, as often as 5 nights per week.

Current News

A number of the Rabbi's students have set up and maintain RabbiLabaton.com, to help perpetuate his legacy through his teachings. The site contains hundreds of audio lectures, tributes, and other notes from his archives. They are also working to archive the contents of the Rabbi's personal library, which include thousands of titles of Jewish Academia, as well as his personal archives of speeches and lecture notes.

Works
A Comprehensive Analysis of Rabenu Abraham Maimuni’s Biblical Commentary: A Dissertation

References

External links
RabbiLabaton.com
"In Memoriam: Rabbi Ezra Labaton" by Rabbi Marc D. Angel
A Comprehensive Analysis of Rabenu Abraham Maimuni’s Biblical Commentary: A Dissertation

1950 births
2013 deaths
American Orthodox rabbis
Brandeis University alumni
Jewish philosophers
People from Brooklyn
Yeshiva University alumni